Osredek nad Stično is a small settlement in the Municipality of Ivančna Gorica in central Slovenia. It lies in the hills north of Stična in the historical region of Lower Carniola. The municipality is now included in the Central Slovenia Statistical Region.

Name
The name of the settlement was changed from Osredek to Osredek nad Stično in 1955.

References

External links

Osredek nad Stično on Geopedia

Populated places in the Municipality of Ivančna Gorica